During the evening of 19 August 2022, al-Shabaab gunmen attacked the Hayat Hotel in Mogadishu, Somalia. Initially, two car bombs exploded. Gunmen then stormed the hotel, shooting people and taking hostages. At least 21 people were killed, and 117 others were wounded, fifteen of whom are in critical condition. The number of gunmen involved in the attack is currently unknown.

Reaction 
 President Hassan Sheikh Mohamud holds an extraordinary meeting with the National Security Committee and, during a televised address, declares "total war" against al-Shabaab.
 The Ministry of Foreign Affairs condemned the attack.
  The United States Department of State released a statement condemning the attacks and praising Somalia's security forces.
  The Ministry of Foreign Affairs (Türkiye) Press Released Regarding the Terrorist Attacks in Somalia (Mogadishu).

See also
Mogadishu bombings
Timeline of al-Shabaab-related events

References

2022 murders in Somalia
2020s building bombings
2022 hotel attack
21st-century mass murder in Somalia
2022 hotel
Attacks on buildings and structures in 2022
2022 hotel
August 2022 crimes in Africa
Building bombings in Somalia
Hostage taking in Somalia
Islamic terrorist incidents in 2022
Mass murder in 2022
Somali Civil War (2009–present)
Terrorist incidents in Somalia in 2022